Manuel Henrique Baptista Gomes Charana (born 24 October 1976 in Cedofeita, Porto District), commonly known as Kiko, is a Portuguese retired professional footballer who played as a forward. 

After arriving in England in December 1996, Kiko played thrice in the Football League Second Division for Stockport County. Kiko played two times for Campomaiorense during the 1997–98 Portuguese Primeira Divisão.

References

External links

1976 births
Living people
Portuguese footballers
Association football forwards
Primeira Liga players
Liga Portugal 2 players
Segunda Divisão players
O Elvas C.A.D. players
C.F. Os Belenenses players
S.C. Campomaiorense players
G.D. Estoril Praia players
English Football League players
Stockport County F.C. players
Portuguese expatriate footballers
Expatriate footballers in England